Apote is a genus of shield-backed katydids in the family Tettigoniidae. There are at least two described species in Apote.

Species
These two species belong to the genus Apote:
 Apote notabilis Scudder, 1897 (notable apote)
 Apote robusta Caudell, 1907 (robust apote)

References

Further reading

 

Tettigoniinae
Articles created by Qbugbot